Kwame Bawuah-Edusei is a Ghanaian physician, entrepreneur and diplomat. He served as Ghana's ambassador to Switzerland from 2004 to 2006, and Ghana's Ambassador to the United States of America from 2006 to 2009.

Early life and education 
Bawuah-Edusei was born 10 June 1955. He had his secondary education at Kumasi Academy, and proceeded to the Kwame Nkrumah University of Science and Technology where he studied Human Biology. He later entered the Howard University Hospital where he had his medical residency in family medicine.

Career 
Bawuah-Edusei worked as a medical practitioner and an entrepreneur prior to his ambassadorial appointment. He was the head of Educe Medical Center, a hospital he founded in Alexandria, Virginia. He founded the Educe Capital LLC, a firm that focused on bio-medicine, real estate, and agro processing, and also founded the EO Group with his business partner George Yaw Owusu. In 2004 Bawuah-Edusei was appointed Ghana's ambassador to Switzerland. He served in this capacity until 2006 when he was appointed Ghana's Ambassador to the United States of America. He held this office until 2009.

Personal life 
Bawuah-Edusei is married to Evangeline Bawuah-Edusei.

Book 
Thrived Despite the Odds, 2019

See also 
 Embassy of Ghana in Washington, D.C.

References 

1955 births
Living people
Ghanaian medical doctors
Ghanaian diplomats
Ambassadors of Ghana to Switzerland
Ambassadors of Ghana to the United States
Kumasi Academy alumni